The North American Gaeltacht is a gathering place for Irish speakers in the community of Tamworth, Ontario, in Canada.  The nearest main township is Erinsville, Ontario. Unlike in Ireland, where the term "" refers to an area where Irish is the traditional language, this part of Ontario has no resident native Irish speakers. The name refers instead to its being a meeting place for Irish speakers from North America and elsewhere.

History

Erinsville was settled by the Irish, and its first five mayors were Irish. It is from this area that the Gaeltacht received its name of "" or "Erinsville/Town of Ireland Gaeltacht".

This site was the first and only officially sanctioned  (or "designated Irish-speaking area") to exist outside Ireland. A statement was also released by the then Minister for Community, Rural and Gaeltacht Affairs, Éamon Ó Cuív. In this, dated 29 May 2007, he stated: "I would like to congratulate the Canadian people for establishing a Gaeltacht in Canada, the first outside Ireland."  Ó Cuív also approved the funding of €20,000 (C$28,835) for teacher training.

Following its launch, the project received some news coverage, primarily for the claim that it was the first of its kind outside Ireland, including by RTÉ and TG4 in Ireland, the BBC in the UK, and the Globe and Mail in Canada.

Aims and activities

The project's stated aim is to "restore and maintain the language by having a place where speakers can make connections with each other, learn and practice Irish". The site is intended to be used for Irish language immersion weeks and to build a learning centre. Other objectives are to arrange exchanges with  families, to provide an Irish-language summer camp for children and to bring teachers from Ireland.

As of 2021, cultural events and "language immersion" courses were happening virtually and at the site.

See also
Neo-Gaeltacht

References

External links
 

Gaeltacht places
Culture of Ontario
Lennox and Addington County
Irish diaspora in Canada
Linguistic geography of Canada